Environmental Protection Training and Research Institute known as EPTRI is a research institute located in Hyderabad, India. The institute provides training, consultancy, applied research services and extends advocacy in the area of environment protection.

See also
 Manu Needhi Consumer and Environmental Protection Centre

External links
 Official site
 http://www.eptri.com/pgdmem/

Research institutes in Hyderabad, India
Year of establishment missing